Richard H. Lackman (September 20, 1910 – March 12, 1990) was an American football halfback who played three seasons with the Philadelphia Eagles of the National Football League. He attended Germantown High School in Philadelphia, Pennsylvania.

References

External links
Just Sports Stats

1910 births
1990 deaths
Players of American football from Philadelphia
American football halfbacks
Philadelphia Eagles players